As You Are may refer to:

Film and television
As You Are (play) Australian television play which aired in 1958 on ABC
As You Are (film), a 2016 American film

Music

Albums
As You Are (album) by Jason Lancaster, 2014

Songs
"As You Are" (Dean Martin song), 1951
"As You Are", by The Weeknd from Beauty Behind the Madness, 2015
"As You Are", by Travis from The Man Who, 1999
"As You Are", by Boney James from Ride, 2001
"As You Are", by Kimbra from The Golden Echo, 2014
"As You Are", by Charlie Puth from Nine Track Mind, 2016
"As You Are" (Rag'n'Bone Man song), 2017

See also
Alive as You Are, 2010 album by Darker My Love
Be as You Are (disambiguation)
"Be as You Are (Songs from an Old Blue Chair)", song by Kenny Chesney
"Be as You Are" (Mike Posner song), song by Mike Posner from his 2016 album At Night, Alone
Looking As You Are, 2005 album by Embrace
Stay as You Are, a 1978 Italian–Spanish erotic drama film